Puzieux may refer to the following places in France:

 Puzieux, Moselle, a commune in the Moselle department
 Puzieux, Vosges, a commune in the Vosges department